Wáng Dàiyú (ca. 1570 - ca. 1660) was a Chinese Hanafi-Maturidi (Hui) scholar of Arab descent.  His given name was Ya, style name Daiyu.  He called himself Zhenhui Laoren  ("The True Old Man of Islam") and went by his style name.

Life
His earliest ancestor in the early Ming period came to China in the retinue of a Tributary Emissary from the West (the Arabian peninsula).  Because he was adept at the art of astronomy and calculating calendars, he held the office of Master Supervisor of the Imperial Observatory, and was granted a residence in Lu Fei Lane (present day South Hong Wu Street) in Nanjing.

Philosophy
His descendants followed in this field.  As a child, Wang Daiyu learned from his father.  Later, he studied under Ma Junshi from Nanjing.  At the age of 20, he began studying Chinese and an intensive investigation of the writings of Confucianism, Buddhism, Daoism, as well as other miscellaneous teachings.  In the fifteenth year of the reign of the Chongzhen Emperor, he made a translation of Zhengjiao Zhenquan (正教真詮, "A True Explanation of the Right Religion"), in twenty "juan", and began the enterprise of translating the Islamic scriptures into Chinese.  Later, he also wrote Qingzhen Da Xue (清真大學, "The Great learning of Islam") and Xizhen Zhengda (希真正答, "Rare and True Answers").  Within Chinese Islamic circles, he is known by the laudatory title, "Great Saint of the Qing Period." Wang believed in providing Islamic works in Chinese-language versions instead of depending upon Arabic ones.

Works
Wang was fluent in Chinese, Persian, and Arabic. He studied Confucianism extensively and used it to explain Islam.

Wang wrote "The Real Commentary", in which he uses Chinese Classical texts to explain Islam, since Chinese speakers couldn't read original Islamic texts in other languages. He is most critical of Buddhism and Taoism, while citing Confucian ideas which agreed with Islam in order to explain it.

Wang wrote about Islam in the Chinese language and in a Confucian context, not to convert non Muslim Chinese to Islam, but to help Muslims in China understand Islam, since the majority of them spoke Chinese at his time.

Wang also used the Chinese language and Confucianism to explain Islam to non Muslim Han Chinese in addition to Muslims.

Wang Daiyu's works eventually became part of the Chinese Islamic text the Han Kitab, along with other Muslim scholars from eastern China like Liu Zhi, and Ma Zhu.

See also 
 Ma Zhu
 Yusuf Ma Dexin
 Liu Zhi (scholar)
 List of Hanafis
 List of Ash'aris and Maturidis
 List of Muslim theologians

References

External links
王岱輿 CDSIA

Hanafis
Maturidis
17th-century Muslim theologians
Shaykh al-Islāms
Sunni Sufis
Sunni imams
Sunni Muslim scholars of Islam
Ming dynasty scholars
Qing dynasty translators
Hui people
Chinese Muslims
Chinese people of Arab descent
Ming dynasty translators
Writers from Nanjing
Year of birth unknown
Year of death unknown
16th-century Chinese writers
17th-century Chinese writers
1585 births
1658 deaths
17th-century Chinese astronomers
17th-century Chinese translators